is a versus fighting game developed by Dimps and Bandai Namco Entertainment featuring the characters and story of Masami Kurumada's Saint Seiya manga. Announced on April 10, 2015 and released in September 2015 for PlayStation 3 and PlayStation 4 in Japan and Europe and October 6 in North America, the game serves as an updated version to the 2013 Saint Seiya: Brave Soldiers.

Gameplay
Similar to the previous title, Soldiers’ Soul is a 3D versus fighting game, it retains all the features from its predecessor and they've also been enhanced.  PC and PS4 versions will run at 1080p 60fps with better graphics and textures, while the PS3 version will run at 720p 30fps with slightly lower graphics.

In terms of the combat system, game producer Ryo Mito stated that it's been improved by adding more air combos, by increasing the speed of the game and by giving all characters a new projectile called “Photon,” which varies in its effect, depending on the character.  The Cosmo Gauge recharges much faster now, its bars have been removed and Big Bang Attacks are no longer performed with the Cosmo Gauge, instead, they're now part of the Seven Sense Awakening bar, once full, the player can either enter Seventh Sense mode and/or execute their special Big Bang Attacks.

BBAs now have better animations and effects and some that had a sudden lowered brightness in the anterior game has been corrected.  In addition to that, many characters now have more than just one BBA and instead of being locked to a specific costume of a character, players will now be allowed to choose one before each fight session.  They're also now easier to land and are connectable with combos (when in Seventh Sense mode).

Another somewhat improved feature is the fact that various costumes of the same character will no longer be treated as separate characters; instead, they will be now treated as alternate costumes and can be chosen prior to a fight.  There are, however, some outfits that still have to be assigned to a separate slot in the select screen, due to having an exclusive Big Bang Attack.

The Orb System has been revamped to a new feature called “Assist Phrase” and while their effects are mostly the same when a player meets specific conditions in battle, such as reaching low health to boost strength, the difference is that a small inset will appear in the middle of the fight and say such assigned phrase.  Another introduced feature is the “Cosmic K.O.,” when a player finishes a round with a special attack, a small animation will appear, showing the player character sending the opponent to the air, simulating the manga.

One of the most innovative traits is that the game features the Latin American and Brazilian Portuguese dubs, staffed by the original voices from the classic series.  According to Ryo Mito, they were added due to the huge amount of suggestions in the previous game.

A key characteristic of Soldiers’ Soul is that this will be the very first time a Saint Seiya game will include the Asgard Arc and to also integrate the Bronze and Gold Saints wearing their God Cloths.

Plot
Soldiers’ Soul includes two different story modes.

The first one is called “Legend of Cosmo,” which tells the story from the 12 Houses arc to the Hades arc. It's very similar to what was seen in Brave Soldiers, but instead of telling it through 2D images, Soldiers’ Soul tells it with full 3D cinematics and also re-creates various scenes from the series, from the death of Cassius to the execution of Athena Exclamation, including moments with NPCs, such as Kiki and Freya.

The other story mode is called “Battle of Gold,” in which the 12 Gold Saints can be selected in their God Cloths to play a small, but different story with everyone. Many what-ifs battles take place, such as Libra Dohko vs. Alberich, Gemini Saga vs. Kanon and Sagittarius Aiolos vs. Seiya.

Playable characters
All 39 characters and costumes, including downloadable ones, from Brave Soldiers are present.  With the God Warriors and Polaris Hilda added, the game features a total of 48 unique characters with around 146 skins total; the largest roster in any Saint Seiya game to date.

Reception

Soldiers' Soul received mixed reviews from critics, with an aggregated score of 59/100 on Metacritic. Popular Japanese video game magazine Famitsu gave the game an overall score of 30/40.

Eurogamer Italy gave the game a score of 7/10, stating that "Saint Seiya: Soldiers' Soul is the classic more of the same, with a bunch of new characters and items added to the contents of the previous game. The combat system is fun and entertaining, but the lack of any kind of balance between the fighters can ruin the overall experience."

IGN Spain also gave it a 7/10, saying that "Dimps hasn't delivered once again. They could have made much more out of the universe of Saint Seiya."

PlayStation Universe gave a lower score of 5.5/10, describing the game as "A simplistic yet visually attractive take on anime that’s been around longer than most of the people reading this, Saint Seiya: Soldiers' Soul is a decent prospect for newcomers to the role-playing genre but ultimately holds far less appeal for long-time scrapping veterans who want a little more depth from their digital brawlers."

References

External links
 
 

2015 video games
Martial arts video games
Bandai Namco games
Dimps games
Saint Seiya video games
PlayStation 3 games
PlayStation 4 games
Video games developed in Japan
Windows games
3D fighting games
Multiplayer and single-player video games